Damian London (born November 12, 1931, in Chicago, Illinois) is an American stage and television actor. He is most famous for his role as Milo Virini on the science-fiction show Babylon 5. He began his career in a 1957 film The Bachelor Party.

Filmography

External links

 

Living people
1931 births
Male actors from Chicago